Acrodactyla quadrisculpta is a species of insects belonging to the family Ichneumonidae.

It is native to Europe and Northern America.

References

Ichneumonidae